Ephedra lomatolepis is a species of Ephedra that is native to Kazakhstan and to the Tuva region of Siberia.

It was originally described by Alexander Gustav von Schrenk in 1844. Otto Stapf's worldwide monograph on the genus included this species, but Stapf did not place it in a section. Later, it was placed in section Alatae.

References 

lomatolepis
Flora of Kazakhstan
Flora of Siberia
Plants described in 1844